Ruben Darío Hernández Ariza (born February 19, 1965 in Armenia) is a former Colombian football (soccer) striker, one of the leading scorers in his country's history, and one of the early busts of Major League Soccer.

Overall, Hernández scored 180 goals in the Colombian League for ten different teams: Deportes Quindío, Millonarios, Once Caldas, Atlético Nacional, Envigado, Independiente Medellín, América de Cali, Independiente Santa Fe, Deportes Tolima, and Deportivo Pereira. He retired in 2000.

In 1996, "Rubencho" signed with Major League Soccer's MetroStars, but lasted only ten games with them without scoring a goal. He became unhappy in the United States and the league granted him a release back to Colombia.

For Colombia, Hernández scored one goal in 17 caps and played for his country at the 1990 FIFA World Cup.

Notes

1965 births
Living people
Colombian footballers
Colombian expatriate footballers
New York Red Bulls players
Atlético Nacional footballers
Millonarios F.C. players
Once Caldas footballers
América de Cali footballers
Independiente Santa Fe footballers
Independiente Medellín footballers
Deportes Tolima footballers
Deportes Quindío footballers
Deportivo Pereira footballers
Expatriate soccer players in the United States
Colombian expatriate sportspeople in the United States
Colombia international footballers
1989 Copa América players
1990 FIFA World Cup players
Categoría Primera A players
Major League Soccer players
People from Armenia, Colombia
Association football forwards
Footballers from Barranquilla
20th-century Colombian people